Sphegina (Asiosphegina) adusta is a species of hoverfly in the family Syrphidae found in Myanmar. It's easily identified by its large size, left side surstylus with a number of unusual lobes, and general dark-brown coloration. It's similar to S. atricolor and S. furva, but unlike these species it lacks a transverse crest at the base of the lobe located sinistrolaterally at the posterior margin of male sternite IV.

Etymology
The name comes from Latin 'adusta', meaning 'tanned' or 'brown', referring to its almost entirely dark-brown coloration.

Description
In male specimens, body length is 8.3 millimeters and wing length is 6.3 millimeters. The face is strongly concave, moderately projected antero-ventrally, with a weakly developed frontal prominence. The face is blackish brown, medially slightly paler brown; gena brown; occiput black; antenna blackish; thorax blackish brown; scutellum shiny dark brown, the margin slightly paler brown; pro- and mesolegs brown; terga III and IV brownish black. The wings are slightly brownish with brown stigma. The basal flagellomere is as long as it is broad and semi-quadrangular; the arista is covered in soft hairs. The surstylus is strongly asymmetrical and the superior lobes are symmetrical; the left side surstylus has a number of unusual lobes. Female specimens are much the same except for normal sexual dimorphism; body length is 8.6 millimeters and wing length is 7.7 millimeters. Tergite II is predominantly dark-orange and tergite I has an oblique row of four yellow setae.

References

Eristalinae
Insects described in 2015
Diptera of Asia